Thaumantis klugius is a butterfly in the family Nymphalidae. It was described by Johann Zincken in 1831. It is found in the Indomalayan realm.

Subspecies
T. k. klugius (Borneo, Java)
T. k. lucipor Westwood, 1851 (Peninsular Malaya, Singapore)
T. k. candika (Fruhstorfer, 1905) (Sumatra)

Etymology
The name honours Johann Christoph Friedrich Klug.

References

External links
Thaumantis at Markku Savela's Lepidoptera and Some Other Life Forms

Thaumantis
Butterflies described in 1831